The Refugee Olympic Team is a group made up of independent Olympic participants who are refugees. In March 2016, the International Olympic Committee (IOC) President Thomas Bach announced the creation of the Refugee Olympic Athletes Team, as a symbol of hope for all refugees in the world in order to raise global awareness of the scale of the migrant crisis in Europe. In September 2017, the IOC established the Olympic Refugee Foundation to continue supporting refugees in the long term.

The Olympic flag and the Olympic Hymn are used as team symbols. As the participating athletes marched through the opening ceremony of the 2016 Summer Olympics, the team entered the stadium as the penultimate delegation, just before the host country. At the 2020 Summer Olympics, the team entered the stadium second only to Greece.

At the 2016 Summer Olympics, the IOC's country code (ROT) was used, but at the 2020 Summer Olympics it was updated to (EOR) for French Équipe olympique des réfugiés. As of 2022, no refugee Olympic athletes have participated in the Winter Olympic Games.

The team was awarded the 2022 Princess of Asturias Award for Sport for giving athletes the opportunity in conflict zones and places where human rights are violated, preventing them from performing their sporting and personal activities.

Participations 
This category was created in March 2016. The selection criteria include the sporting level, the official refugee status verified by the United Nations, the personal situation and the background of each athlete.

2016 Summer Olympics

2020 Summer Olympics 
At its meeting in Buenos Aires in October 2018, the International Olympic Committee decided to establish the Refugee Olympic Team (EOR) the 2020 Summer Olympics. This decision builds on the legacy of the Refugee Olympic Team in 2016 and is part of the IOC's commitment to play its part in addressing the global refugee crisis and in carrying the message of solidarity and hope to millions of refugee athletes around the world.

The IOC Session tasked Olympic Solidarity with establishing the conditions of participation and defining the team identification and selection process. These elements will be carried out in close collaboration with the National Olympic Committees, the International Sports Federations, the Tokyo 2020 Organizing Committee and the United Nations Refugee Agency (UNHCR). On 20 June 2019, the IOC released the list of Refugee Athlete Scholarship holders who wish to join the IOC Refugee Olympic Team, Tokyo 2020. This announcement was made on World Athlete Day. refugees, celebrated every year on 20 June.

The current 46 Refugee Athlete Scholarship holders include the 10 athletes who were part of the first Refugee Olympic Team in 2016, new individual athletes and a group of athletes preparing at the Tegla Loroupe Refugee Training Center in Kenya. They compete in nine sports. All are assisted by Olympic Solidarity as part of its support program for refugee athletes. Hailing from Afghanistan, Cameroon, Congo, Eritrea, Ethiopia, Iraq, Iran, South Sudan, Sudan and Syria, refugee scholarship holders compete in athletics, badminton, boxing, cycling, judo, karate, shooting, swimming, taekwondo, weightlifting and wrestling.

References

Nations at the Olympics
Refugee
Olympic Athletes